Frédéric Berger (born 24 August 1964) is a French former ski jumper. He competed at the 1988 Winter Olympics.

References

External links

1964 births
Living people
French male ski jumpers
Olympic ski jumpers of France
Ski jumpers at the 1988 Winter Olympics